Thomas Frazer may refer to:

Thomas Frazer (stonemason) (1821–1904), Scottish-born American stonemason in Beaver County, Utah
Thomas Frazer (Auditor General), Sri Lanka
Thomas K. Frazer, American marine scientist

See also
Thomas Fraser (disambiguation)
Tommie Frazier (born 1974), American football player